The Manor, also known as Peter and Jesse Hutton Farm, is a historic home located near Petersburg, Grant County, West Virginia. It was built about 1830, and is a -story, L-shaped brick dwelling in the Greek Revival style. It features a two-story portico with pediment supported by four massive square columns.  Also on the property are dependencies: a kitchen, meathouse, small storage barn, and large frame barn.

It was listed on the National Register of Historic Places in 1975.

References

Houses on the National Register of Historic Places in West Virginia
Greek Revival houses in West Virginia
Houses completed in 1830
Houses in Grant County, West Virginia
Farms on the National Register of Historic Places in West Virginia
National Register of Historic Places in Grant County, West Virginia
1830 establishments in Virginia